Semilimax is a genus of air-breathing land snails, terrestrial pulmonate gastropod mollusks in the family Vitrinidae.

Species
The genus Semilimax includes the following species:
 Semilimax carinthiacus (Westerlund, 1886)
 Semilimax kotulae (Westerlund, 1883)
 Semilimax pyrenaicus (A. Férussac, 1821)
 Semilimax semilimax (A. Férussac, 1802)

References

External links 
 Species in genus Semilimax. AnimalBase

Vitrinidae